3α-Dihydroprogesterone (3α-DHP), also known as 3α-hydroxyprogesterone, as well as pregn-4-en-3α-ol-20-one, is an endogenous neurosteroid. It is biosynthesized by 3α-hydroxysteroid dehydrogenase from progesterone. 3α-DHP has been found to act as a positive allosteric modulator of the GABAA receptor and is described as being as active as allopregnanolone in regard to this action. In accordance, it has anxiolytic effects in animals. 3α-DHP has also been found to inhibit the secretion of follicle-stimulating hormone (FSH) from the rat pituitary gland, demonstrating possible antigonadotropic properties. Unlike the case of most other inhibitory neurosteroids, 3α-DHP production is not blocked by 5α-reductase inhibitors like finasteride. No data were available on the progestogenic activity of 3α-DHP as of 1977. Levels of 5α-DHP have been quantified.

Chemistry

See also
 3β-Dihydroprogesterone
 5α-Dihydroprogesterone
 5β-Dihydroprogesterone
 Pregnanolone
 Pregnenolone

References

GABAA receptor positive allosteric modulators
Neurosteroids
Pregnanes